The 2015 FIVB Volleyball Women's U23 World Championship was held in Ankara, Turkey, from 12 to 19 August 2015. This was the second edition of the tournament.

Competition formula
The competition format will see the 12 teams split into two pools of six teams playing in round robin format. The semifinals will feature the top two teams from each pool.

Qualification
The FIVB Sports Events Council confirmed a proposal to streamline the number of teams participating in the Age Group World Championships on 14 December 2013.

Pools composition
The pool composition was drawn by Serpentine system based on U20 World ranking. Number in the bracket denote the World ranking except the host who ranked 4th.

Squads

Venues

Pool standing procedure
 Number of matches won
 Match points
 Sets ratio
 Points ratio
 Result of the last match between the tied teams
 
Match won 3–0 or 3–1: 3 match points for the winner, 0 match points for the loser
Match won 3–2: 2 match points for the winner, 1 match point for the loser

Preliminary round
All times are Eastern European Summer Time (UTC+03:00).

Pool A

|}

|}

Pool B

|}

|}

Final round
All times are Eastern European Summer Time (UTC+03:00).

5th–8th places

Classification 5th and 8th

|}

Classification 7th

|}

Classification 5th

|}

Championship round

Semifinals

|}

Bronze medal match

|}

Gold medal match

|}

Final standing

Awards

Most Valuable Player
 Juma Silva
Best Setter
 Juma Silva
Best  Outside Spikers
 Brayelin Martinez
 Arisa Inoue

Best Middle Blocker
 Kübra Akman
 Sara Bonifacio
Best Opposite Spiker
 Rosamaria Montibeller
Best Libero
 Gizem Örge

See also
2015 FIVB Volleyball Men's U23 World Championship

References

External links

FIVB Volleyball Women's U23 World Championship
Fivb Women's U23 Volleyball
2015 in Turkish sport
World
2015